Finn Christian "Finken" Jagge (4 April 1966 – 8 July 2020) was a Norwegian alpine skier.

Biography
He was the son of alpine skier Liv Jagge-Christiansen and tennis player Finn Dag Jagge. In the World Cup he won seven slalom victories. He also won the Norwegian Championship eight times. His career highlight came with the gold medal in the slalom competition at the 1992 Olympics in Albertville. He retired in 2000. He trained the Norwegian women ski team from 2005 to 2007. He worked for the Norwegian telecom company Ludo and later as a Partner Headhunter for Dynamic People Headhunting in Oslo. Jagge won the Norwegian reality TV show Mesternes Mester in 2011.  He was 54 years old, when he died after a short illness in July 2020. He was married to Trine-Lise Jagge and had two children.

World Cup victories

References

External links
 
 

1966 births
2020 deaths
Alpine skiers from Oslo
Norwegian male alpine skiers
Alpine skiers at the 1988 Winter Olympics
Alpine skiers at the 1992 Winter Olympics
Alpine skiers at the 1994 Winter Olympics
Alpine skiers at the 1998 Winter Olympics
Olympic alpine skiers of Norway
Olympic medalists in alpine skiing
Medalists at the 1992 Winter Olympics
Olympic gold medalists for Norway